Since their launch in 1995, Junior M.A.F.I.A., an American hip hop group, have released two studio albums - Conspiracy and Riot Musik - and a number of compilation albums, mixtapes, singles (including Get Money from Conspiracy), and music videos.

Studio albums

Compilation albums

Mixtapes

Singles

Guest appearances

Music videos

As lead artist

As featured artist

References

Discographies of American artists
Hip hop discographies